Aliaksandr Fiodaravich Kikiniov (born April 9, 1980) is an amateur Belarusian Greco-Roman wrestler, who competes in the men's middleweight category. He won the bronze medal at the 2009 World Wrestling Championships in Herning, Denmark, defeating Germany's Konstantin Schneider. He is also a three-time medalist at the European Championships.

Kikiniou made his official debut at the 2004 Summer Olympics in Athens, where he competed in the men's 74 kg class. He lost two straight matches each to China's Sai Yinjiya (3–5) and Switzerland's Reto Bucher by a 2–3 score, leaving him on the bottom of the pool and placing fifteenth in the final standings.

At the 2012 Summer Olympics in London, Kikiniou made an Olympic comeback from his eight-year absence, again in the 74 kg class. He reached the quarter-final round of the event, where he was outclassed by Armenia's Arsen Julfalakyan, who was able to score three technical points in two successive periods. Because Julfalakyan advanced further into the final match against Russia's Roman Vlasov, Kikiniou was offered another shot for an Olympic bronze medal through the repechage bouts. He first defeated Kyrgyzstan's Daniar Kobonov, but lost the bronze medal match to Azerbaijan's Emin Ahmadov, who formidably pushed him out of the wrestling mat in the third period, with a 2–3 decision.

References

External links
 

1980 births
Living people
Belarusian male sport wrestlers
Olympic wrestlers of Belarus
Wrestlers at the 2004 Summer Olympics
Wrestlers at the 2012 Summer Olympics
Sportspeople from Gomel
World Wrestling Championships medalists
20th-century Belarusian people
21st-century Belarusian people